The Innominate is a mountain peak located in the Bighorn Mountains in the U.S. state of Wyoming. Situated along a knife-like ridge known as an arête, the summit is located in the Cloud Peak Wilderness of Bighorn National Forest. A small glacier lies below the arête to the east.

References

Mountains of Big Horn County, Wyoming
Mountains of Johnson County, Wyoming
Mountains of Wyoming
Bighorn National Forest